Brotherton is a surname. Notable people with the surname include:

Alice Williams Brotherton (1848-1930), American writer
Edward Brotherton, 1st Baron Brotherton, English businessman and politician
Helen Brotherton, English conservationist
John Brotherton, American actor
John Brotherton (industrialist) (1829–1917), innovative tube manufacturer who served as the 33rd Mayor of Wolverhampton 1883/84
Joseph Brotherton, English politician
Michael Brotherton, British journalist and politician
Simon Brotherton, British sports announcer
Thomas William Brotherton, British Army general
Thomas of Brotherton, 1st Earl of Norfolk
Wilbur Brotherton I1922-2021), American politician
 Robert Brotherton, assistant to Julia Haart 
Lily Brotherton, American physical therapist